Shi Jianlin is a Chinese chemist specializing in inorganic chemistry.

Early life and education
Shi was born in Taicang, Jiangsu in 1964. In 1983 he graduated from Nanjing Tech University. In 1989 he received his doctor's degree from the Shanghai Institute of Ceramics, Chinese Academy of Sciences (CAS) under the supervision of Yan Dongsheng.

Career
He is now a researcher and doctoral supervisor at the Shanghai Institute of Ceramics, Chinese Academy of Sciences (CAS).

Honours and awards
 2008 "Chang Jiang Scholar" (or "Yangtze River Scholar") 
 2011 State Natural Science Award (Second Class) 
 2016 Fellow of the Royal Society of Chemistry 
 November 22, 2019 Academician of the Chinese Academy of Sciences (CAS)

References

1954 births
People from Taicang
Chemists from Jiangsu
Living people
Nanjing University of Technology alumni
Fellows of the Royal Society of Chemistry
Members of the Chinese Academy of Sciences
Scientists from Suzhou